Josef Danhauser (19 August 1805 in Laimgrube (now a part of Mariahilf or Neubau) – 4 May 1845) was an Austrian painter, one of the main artists of Biedermeier period, together with Ferdinand Georg Waldmüller, Peter Fendi, among others. His works, not very appreciated in his time, dealt with very moralising subjects and had a clear influence of William Hogarth.

Biography
Joseph Danhauser was born in Vienna in 1805, the eldest son of sculptor and furniture manufacturer Joseph Ulrich Danhauser and his wife Johanna (née Lambert).

He took his first painting lessons with his father and later assisted the Vienna Academy of Fine Arts. He studied with Johann Peter Krafft and made his first exhibition in 1826.

Invited by Johann Ladislaus Pyrker, patriarch of Venice, he visited the city of Doges, where he started to study the Italian masters. He came back to Vienna via Trieste in 1827, visiting Prague. On 27 March 1827 he and his colleague :de:Johann Matthias Ranftl molded Ludwig van Beethoven's death mask, roughly 12 hours after his death and Danhauser painted a water-colour representing his deathbed. In 1828, he spent some time in Eger, with an invitation of this Hungarian city archbishop Pyrker. He solicited him for some pictures for the gallery of the Archdiocese.

After his father's death in 1829, his brothers and he managed his furniture factory during the Biedermeier movement, being the precursors of modern design. That made him put his painting career aside.

In 1833, he responded to a second invitation from Eger's archbishop, and he painted The martyr of Saint John for a new basilica in the city, and he received the Vienna Academy prize for his picture Die Verstoßung der Hagar, and he specialised in Genre works. In 1838, he was appointed vice-rector of the Academy and married Josephine Streit, who was the daughter of a physician and with whom he had three children, Josef,Gustav, Marie and Julie, born in 1839, 1841 and 1843 respectively.

Josef Danhauser was appointed professor of historical Painting at the Academy in 1841, but he left this occupation, and he travelled around Germany and the Netherlands with the textile maker, art aficionado and art sponsor Rudolf von Arthaber. In this journey, he was very interested in the Dutch School and the format of his works was smaller. He died of typhus in Vienna in 1845 and was buried in Hundstrumer Cemetery, though his grave was later moved. In 1862, a street was named after him in Vienna.

Works 
(dimensions given in metres)

 Rudolf von Habsburg und der Einsiedler in der Kapelle von Lilienfeld (1825), oil on canvas, 0.727 x 0.588, Budapest, Szépművészeti Múzeum
 Wallenstein ersticht sich im Zelte Ottokars - Szene aus Pyrkers Rudolphias (1825), oil on canvas, 0.59 x 0.738, Budapest, Szépművészeti Múzeum
 Ottokar erklärt Rudolf auf dem Turnierplatz mitten im Sturm den Krieg (1825), oil on canvas, 0.603 x 0.741, Wien Museum

 Das Scholarenzimmer eines Malers (1828), oil on canvas, 0.40 x 0.52, Vienna, Österreichische Galerie Belvedere
 Komische Szene in einem Maleratelier (1829), oil on canvas, 0.365 x 0.495, Vienna, Österreichische Galerie Belvedere
 Bildnis eines Knaben (1829), oil on canvas, 0.42 x 0.345, Wien Museum
 Porträt Ladislaus Pyrkers, oil on paper, 0.32 x 0.26, Vienna, Österreichische Galerie Belvedere
 Maleratelier mit Jeanne d'Arc (1830), oil on canvas, 0.78 x 1.035, Budapest, Szépművészeti Múzeum
 Selbstporträt (1830–1835), oil on wood, 0.233 x 0.20, Wien Museum
 Die Schlafenden (1831), oil on canvas, 0.685 x 0.51, Budapest, Szépművészeti Múzeum
 Ottokars Tod (1832), oil on canvas, 1.035 x 0.845, Budapest, Szépművészeti Múzeum
 Der letzte Kampf zwischen Rudolf und Ottokar (1832), oil on canvas, 0.585 x 0.695, Budapest, Szépművészeti Múzeum
 Porträt der Frau von Streit, der Schwiegermutter des Künstlers (1833), oil on canvas, 0.92 x 0.715, Linz, Oberösterreichischen Landesmuseen
 Abraham verstößt Hagar (1833), oil on canvas, Vienna, Österreichische Galerie Belvedere
 Das Bekenntnis (1834), oil on canvas, 1.28 x 0.96, Wien Museum
 Die Frau des Fischers mit ihrem Kinde (1835), oil on wood, 0.41 x 0.49, private collection.

 Der reiche Prasser (1836), oil on canvas, 0.855 x 1.33, Vienna, Österreichische Galerie Belvedere
 Der abgewiesene Freier (1836), oil on wood, 0.63 x 0.486, Wien Museum
 Die Frau des Fischers am Meeresufer (1837), oil on wood, 0.395 x 0.485, Vienna, Österreichische Galerie Belvedere
 Der Augenarzt (1837), oil on canvas, 0.94 x 1.25, Wien Museum
 Die Klostersuppe (1838), oil on wood, 0.855 x 1.30, Vienna, Österreichische Galerie Belvedere
 Das Lotterielos (1838), oil on canvas, 0.885 x 0.71, Wien Museum
 Die Testamentseröffnung (1839), oil on wood, 0.95 x 1.19, Vienna, Österreichische Galerie Belvedere
 Der Pfennig der Witwe (1839), oil on canvas, 0.97 x 1.27, Salzbourg, Residenzgalerie
 Die Schachpartie (1839), oil on canvas, 1,35 x 1,75, Vienna, Österreichische Galerie Belvedere
 Die Mutterliebe (1839), oil on canvas, 0.507 x 0.42, Vienna, Österreichische Galerie Belvedere
 Wein, Weib und Gesang (1839), Vienna, Österreichische Galerie Belvedere
 Franz Liszt, am Flügel phantasierend ("Franz Liszt Fantasizing at the Piano") (1840), Berlin, Alte Nationalgalerie
 Porträt des Klavierfabrikanten Konrad Graf (1840), oil on wood, 0.82 x 0.63, Vienne, Österreichische Galerie Belvedere
 Die Zeitungsleser (1840), oil on wood, 0.21 x 0.17, Vienna, Österreichische Galerie Belvedere
 Die Frau vom Meer (1840), oil on wood, 0.51 x 0.39 

 Der Astronom Karl Ludwig Edler von Littrow und Gattin Auguste geb. Bischoff (1841), oil on paperboard, 0.50 x 0.38, Wien Museum
 Die Hundekomödie (1841), oil on canvas, 0.603 x 0.658, Wien Museum
 Die Romanlektüre (1841), oil on canvas, 0.63 x 0.788, Munich, Galerie Grünwald
 Madame Lenormand weissagt der Kaiserin Josephine die Trennung von Napoleon (1841), oil on wood, 0.74 x 0.83, lost picture
 Das Kind und seine Welt (1842), oil on wood, 0.226 x 0.29, Wien Museum
 Die kleinen Virtuosen (1843), oil on paperboard, 0.40 x 0.365, Vienna, Österreichische Galerie Belvedere
 Das A-B-C (1843), oil on wood, 0.385 x 0.355, Wien Museum
 Die Brautwerbung (1844), oil on wood, 0.45 x 0.57, private collection
 Der Gottscheer Junge (1844), oil on wood, private collection 
 Bildnis Franz von Schober (1844), oil on wood, 0.16 x 0.13, Wien Museum
 Die aufgehobene Zinspfändung (1844), oil on wood, 0.90 x 1.08, Linz, Oberösterreichischen Landesmuseen
 Die Dorfpolitiker (1844), oil on wood, 0.36 x 0.406, Vienna, City Galerie
 Das Stiegenweibchen (1845), oil on wood, 0.42 x 0.335, Vienna, Galerie Hassfurthe
 Franz Stelzhamer (1845), oil on canvas, 0.74 x 0.60, Linz, Oberösterreichischen Landesmuseen
 Franz Danhauser, der Bruder des Künstlers (1845), oil on paperboard, 0.343 x 0.272, Wien Museum

References

Bibliography
 Birke, Veronika (1983)  Josef Danhauser (1805–1845), Gemalde Und Zeichnungen, Wien: Osterreichischer Bundesverlag.

External links 

 Danhauser, Josef, in Constant von Wurzbach, Biographisches Lexikon des Kaiserthums Oesterreich, 3. Band, Wien 1858.
 Danhauser, Joseph Karl Weiß In: Allgemeine Deutsche Biographie (ADB). Band 4, Duncker & Humblot, Leipzig 1876, S. 726–729.

19th-century Austrian painters
19th-century Austrian male artists
Austrian male painters
People from Mariahilf
1805 births
1845 deaths
Biedermeier painters